The authorship of the Johannine works (the Gospel of John, the Johannine epistles, and the Book of Revelation) has been debated by biblical scholars since at least the 2nd century AD. The debate focuses mainly on the identity of the author(s), as well as the date and location of authorship of these writings.

Although authorship of all of these works has traditionally been attributed to John the Apostle, only a minority of contemporary scholars believe he wrote the gospel, and most conclude that he wrote none of them. Although some scholars conclude the author of the epistles was different from that of the gospel, most scholars agree that all three epistles are written by the same author  or school of thought. 

With respect to the date and location of authorship of these writings, there is general agreement that all four works probably originated from the same Johannine community. That community is traditionally and plausibly either attributed to Ephesus or Damascus, circa AD 90-110.

In the case of Revelation, many modern scholars agree that it was written by a separate author, John of Patmos, c. 95 with some parts possibly dating to Nero's reign in the early 60s.

Early use and attribution of the Johannine works

Attestation
The first supposed witness to Johannine theology among the Fathers of the Church is in Ignatius of Antioch, whose Letter to the Philippians some claim references John 3:8 and alludes to John 10:7-9 and John 14:6, but none of these are direct quotations or contain information exclusive to John. Polycarp of Smyrna quotes about the "antichrist" in his Epistle to the Phillipians 7:1, a sure reference from the letters of John because the antichrist doctrine is not found in the textual record before the Johannine letters. Justin Martyr also alludes to ideas in John, though this reference is not certain, so the dating of John is not settled.

The earliest testimony to the author was that of Papias, preserved in fragmentary quotes in Eusebius's history of the Church. This text is consequently rather obscure. Eusebius says that two different Johns must be distinguished, John the Apostle, and John the Presbyter, with the Gospel assigned to the Apostle and the Book of Revelation to the presbyter.

Irenaeus's witness based on Papias represents the tradition in Ephesus, where John the Apostle is reputed to have lived. Irenaeus was a disciple of Polycarp, thus in the second generation after the apostle. According to many scholars, he states unequivocally that the apostle is the author of the Gospel. (Other scholars note, however, that Irenaeus consistently refers to the author of the gospel, as well as of Revelation, as "the disciple of the Lord," whereas he refers to the others as "apostles." And so Irenaeus appears to distinguish John, the author of the fourth gospel, from John the apostle.) Koester rejects the reference of Ignatius of Antioch as referring to the Gospel and cites Irenaeus as the first to use it.

For some time it was common practice to assert that the Rylands Library Papyrus P52, which contains a small portion of chapter 18 of the Gospel of John, demonstrated that the text of the gospel spread rapidly through Egypt in the second century. However, more recent scholarship has shown the fragment may date from as late as the third or fourth century, rather than the second century, as was previously supposed.

Clement of Alexandria mentions John the Apostle's missionary activity in Asia Minor, and continues, "As for John, the last, upon seeing that in the Gospels they had told the corporal matters, supported by his disciples and inspired by the Holy Spirit, he wrote a spiritual Gospel." Origen, when asked how John had placed the cleansing of the Temple first rather than last, responded, "John does not always tell the truth literally, he always tells the truth spiritually." In Alexandria, the authorship of the Gospel and the first epistle was never questioned. Bruce Metzger stated "One finds in Clement's work citations of all the books of the New Testament with the exception of Philemon, James, 2 Peter, and 2 and 3 John."

Rome was the home to the only early rejection of the fourth Gospel. The adversaries of Montanism were responsible. Irenaeus says that these persons tried to suppress the teaching about the Holy Spirit in order to put down Montanism, and as a result denied the authorship of the Gospel and its authority. Later Epiphanius called this group, who were followers of the priest Caius, the Alogi in a wordplay between "without the Word" and "without reason".

Quotations
The gospel was not widely quoted until late in the 2nd century. Justin Martyr is probably the first Church Father to quote the Gospel of John. Some scholars conclude that in antiquity John was probably considered less important than the synoptics. Walter Bauer suggests:

One reason for this 'orthodox ambivalence' was gnostic acceptance of the fourth gospel. The early Gnostic use is referred to by Irenaeus, Hippolytus and Origen in quoted commentary made on John by the Gnostics Ptolemy, Basilides and Heracleon. In the quote below Irenaeus argues against the gnostic heresy from his book Against Heresies:

Several church fathers of the 2nd century never quoted John, but the earliest extant written commentary on any book of the New Testament was that written on John by Heracleon, a disciple of the gnostic Valentinus.

The following table shows the number of times various church fathers cited John compared to the synoptic gospels.

Gospel of John

The authorship of the Gospel of John, the Fourth Gospel, is widely contested. Scholars have debated the authorship of Johannine literature since at least the third century, but especially since the Enlightenment.

Overview 
A summary of the proposed candidates is as follows:
 The apostle John, son of Zebedee – traditionally the author was identified as John the Apostle, but his authorship is almost universally rejected by modern scholars.
 John of Patmos, the author of the Book of Revelation (alias the Apocalypse of John) – mainstream scholars conclude that John of Patmos did not write the Gospel of John due to a wide range of differences in eschatology, language, and tone between the two texts.
 John the Presbyter – an obscure early church figure mentioned in the writings of Papias of Hierapolis.
 John the Evangelist – apart from being a potential nickname for any of the figures mentioned above, he could be an otherwise unknown person called John who wrote the Fourth Gospel.
 The Disciple whom Jesus loved (or Beloved Disciple) – an unnamed person referenced several times in the Fourth Gospel itself. Some theologians and scholars have, by way of elimination, identified this disciple as one of the Twelve Disciples of Jesus, usually John, son of Zebedee. Other scholars point out that verse 21:24 indicates that the author is someone other than this disciple, and that the author has merely used a (written or oral) report, allegedly from this disciple, as a source for the writing of the Fourth Gospel.
 A hypothetical "Johannine community" – a number of different authors who wrote the Fourth Gospel together, none of whom were necessarily named 'John'.
 An unknown author – some scholars have concluded that, since the Fourth Gospel is anonymous, none of the proposed candidates are plausible (there is no reason to assume he was actually named 'John'), and that because no new evidence is likely to emerge, the real author will remain unknown and unnamed. At most, the author is merely referred to as 'John' (and the Fourth Gospel as 'Gospel of John') for the sake of convention, a placeholder name for an otherwise unknown person.
 Lazarus of Bethany

Dating
The Gospel of John is considered to be the last of the four canonical Gospels to be written. Most modern scholars date it to between 90 and 100AD, although a minority suggest an even later date. The Fourth Gospel may also have been written later as it was penned for a smaller group within the Johannine community, and was not circulated widely until a later date. However, claims of authorship that date much later than 100AD have been called into question due to the  Rylands Library Papyrus P52, a fragment of the gospel found in Egypt that was probably written around 125AD.

19th century views
According to Adolf Julicher, K.G. Bretschneider's 1820s work on the topic of Johannine authorship pioneered the modern critical scholarship on this topic. Bretschneider called into question the apostolic authorship of the Gospel, and even stated that, on the basis of the author's unsteady grip of topography, the author could not have come from Palestine. He argued that the meaning and nature of Jesus presented in the Gospel of John was very different from that in the Synoptic Gospels, and thus its author could not have been an eyewitness to the events. Bretschneider cited an apologetic character in John, indicating a later date of composition. Scholars such as Wellhausen, Wendt, and Spitta have argued that the fourth gospel is a Grundschrift or a, "..work which had suffered interpolation before arriving at its canonical form; it was a unity as it stood."

Walter Bauer opened the modern discussion on John with his book Rechtgläubigkeit und Ketzerei im ältesten Christentum. Bauer's thesis is that "the heretics probably outnumbered the orthodox" in the early Christian world and that heresy and orthodoxy were not as narrowly defined as we now define them. He was "convinced that none of the Apostolic Fathers had relied on the authority of the Fourth Gospel. It was the gnostics, the Marcionites, and the Montanists who first used it and introduced it to the Christian community."

John the Apostle
Most scholars conclude that the apostle John, son of Zebedee, wrote none of the Johannine works, including the Gospel of John (that is therefore sometimes referred to as the 'Fourth Gospel' in order to dissociate John from it). Various objections to John the Apostle's authorship have been raised: 
 The Synoptic Gospels are united in identifying John as a fisherman from Galilee, and  refers to John as "without learning" or "unlettered".
 The Fourth Gospel is written by someone who, based on their style and knowledge of the Greek language and grammar, would have to have been well-educated in Greek; on the other hand, as an uneducated illiterate Galilean fisherman, John the Apostle would most likely have had Aramaic as his native language, and no knowledge of any other language, let alone the ability to write in the sophisticated Greek of the Fourth Gospel.
 The Fourth Gospel emphasises Judea, and the author seems to have had advanced knowledge of Judean topography, so likely came from there; on the other hand, John the Apostle came from Galilee.
 The Fourth Gospel is a highly intellectual account of Jesus' life and is familiar with Rabbinic traditions of biblical interpretation.

A minority of scholars, mostly Anglo-American ones, continue to support John the Apostle as the author of the Fourth Gospel. In favor of the historical and eyewitness character of the Gospel, a few passages are cited. John's chronology for the death of Jesus seems more realistic, because the Synoptic Gospels would have the trial before the Sanhedrin occurring on the first day of the Passover, which was a day of rest.

The question remains why the anonymously written Fourth Gospel was eventually given the title 'the Gospel of John' (or 'the Gospel according to John'), especially because John, son of Zebedee is never even mentioned in the Fourth Gospel. This may be due to the fact that John, son of Zebedee, who is one of the most important apostles in the Synoptic Gospels, would otherwise be entirely missing in the Fourth Gospel. However, critical scholars have suggested some other possibilities, as it was common at the time to forge documents in someone else's name, or attribute anonymous works already in circulation to a famous person, for credibility.

The beloved disciple

The phrase the disciple whom Jesus loved (ho mathētēs hon ēgapā ho Iēsous) or, in John 20:2, the disciple beloved of Jesus (hon ephilei ho Iēsous) is used six times in the Gospel of John, but in no other New Testament accounts of Jesus.  states that the Gospel of John is based on the written testimony of this disciple. Although since the 2nd century some people have taken verse 21:24 to mean that the author of the Gospel of John himself was the eyewitness (namely the disciple whom Jesus loved), other scholars point out that verse 21:24 indicates that the author is someone else than this disciple, because he's speaking about himself in the first person plural ('we know') and the disciple in the third person ('the disciple... who has written all these things'). Therefore, the author merely claims to have used an earlier written report, allegedly from this disciple, as a source for writing the Fourth Gospel.
 Even if the beloved disciple is to be accepted as the author of the Fourth Gospel, however, this still leaves open the question of what the identity of this beloved disciple was.

Hugh J. Schonfield, in the controversial The Passover Plot (1965) and other works, saw evidence that the source of this Gospel was the Beloved Disciple of the Last Supper and further that this person, perhaps named John, was a senior Temple priest and so probably a member of the Sanhedrin. This would account for the knowledge of and access to the Temple which would not have been available to rough fishermen and followers of a disruptive rural preacher from the Galilee, one who was being accused of heresy besides, and probably for the evanescent presence of the Beloved Disciple in the events of Jesus' Ministry. On this reading, the Gospel was perhaps written by a student and follower of this disciple in his last years, perhaps at Patmos. Schonfield agrees that the Gospel was the product of the Apostle's great age, but further identifies him as the Beloved Disciple of the Last Supper, and so believes that the Gospel is based on first hand witness, though decades later and perhaps through the assistance of a younger follower and writer, which may account for the mixture of Hebraicisms (from the Disciple) and Greek idiom (from the assistant).

Identification with John the Apostle 
Since the end of the first century, the Beloved Disciple has been commonly identified with John the Evangelist. In his early-4th-century Ecclesiastical History, Eusebius wrote 'the apostle and evangelist John, the one whom Jesus loved...'. Objections are raised against the identification of John the Apostle with the "disciple whom Jesus loved", because the latter is not mentioned before the Last Supper. The title ("beloved disciple") is also strange to George Beasley-Murray because "if the beloved disciple were one of the Twelve, he would have been sufficiently known outside the Johannine circle of churches for the author to have named him".<ref>Keener, The Gospel of John: Volume 1, 84; See also George Beasley-Murray, John, (Waco: Word Books, 1987), lxxiii</ref>

 Identifications with others 
Parker suggested that this disciple might be John Mark; nonetheless, the Acts of the Apostles indicate that John Mark was very young and a late-comer as a disciple. J. Colson suggested that "John" was a priest in Jerusalem, explaining the alleged priestly mentality in the fourth gospel. R. Schnackenburg suggested that "John" was an otherwise unknown resident of Jerusalem who was in Jesus' circle of friends. The Gospel of Philip and the Gospel of Mary identify Mary Magdalene as the disciple whom Jesus loved, a connection that has been analyzed by Esther de Boer and made notorious in the fictional The Da Vinci Code. Finally, a few authors, such as Loisy and Bultmann and Hans-Martin Schenke, see "the Beloved Disciple" as a purely symbolic creation, an idealized pseudonym for the group of authors.

Filson, Sanders, Vernard Eller, Rudolf Steiner, and Ben Witherington suggest Lazarus, since  and  specifically indicates that Jesus "loved" him.

Johannine community

While evidence regarding the author is slight, some scholars believe this gospel developed from a school or Johannine circle working at the end of the 1st century, possibly in Ephesus. This hypothetical group of writers has been termed the Johannine community.

Raymond E. Brown, among others, posit a community of writers rather than a single individual that gave final form to the work. In particular, Chapter 21 is very stylistically different from the main body of the Gospel, and is thought to be a later addition (known as the appendix). Among many Christian scholars the view has evolved that there were multiple stages of development involving the disciples as well as the apostle; Brown (1970) distinguishes four stages of development: traditions connected directly with the apostle, partial editing by his disciples, synthesis by the apostle, and additions by a final editor. At the very least, it seems clear that in chapter 21 someone else speaks in the first person plural ("we"), ostensibly as the voice of a community that believes the testimony of this other person called the "beloved disciple" to be true.

More recently, scholars including Adele Reinhartz and Robert Kysar have challenged the idea of a Johannine community and cite the lack of evidence for such a community.

Possible Gnostic origins

Criticism in the early 20th century centered on the idea of the Logos (word), which was perceived as a Hellenistic concept. Thus H. J. Holtzmann hypothesized a dependence of the work on Philo Judaeus; Albert Schweitzer considered the work to be a Hellenized version of Pauline mysticism, while R. Reitzenstein sought the work's origin in Egyptian and Persian mystery religions.

Rudolf Bultmann took a different approach to the work. He hypothesized a Gnostic origin (specifically Mandaeanism which maintains that Jesus was a mšiha kdaba or "false prophet,") for the work. He noted similarities with the Pauline corpus, but attributed this to a common Hellenistic background. He claimed that the many contrasts in the Gospel, between light and darkness, truth and lies, above and below, and so on, show a tendency toward dualism, explained by the Gnostic roots of the work. Despite the Gnostic origin, Bultmann commended the author for several improvements over Gnosticism, such as the Judeo-Christian view of creation and the demythologizing of the role of the Redeemer. He saw the Gospel as an investigation into a God who was wholly Other and transcendent, seeing no place in the vision of the author for a Church or sacraments.

Bultmann's analysis is still widely applied in German-speaking countries, although with many corrections and discussions. Wide-ranging replies have been made to this analysis. Today, most Christian exegetes reject much of Bultmann's theory, but accept certain of his intuitions. For instance, J. Blank uses Bultmann in his discussion of the Last Judgment and W. Thüsing uses him to discuss the elevation and glorification of Jesus. In the English-speaking world, Bultmann has had less impact. Instead, these scholars tended to continue in the investigation of the Hellenistic and Platonistic theories, generally returning to theories closer to the traditional interpretation. By way of example, G.H.C. McGregor (1928) and W.F. Howard (1943) belong to this group.

The discovery of the Dead Sea Scrolls in Qumran (1946/47–1956) marked a change in Johannine scholarship. Several of the hymns, presumed to come from a community of Essenes, contained the same sort of plays between opposites – light and dark, truth and lies – which are themes within the Gospel. Thus the hypothesis that the Gospel relied on Gnosticism fell out of favor. Many suggested further that John the Baptist himself belonged to an Essene community, and if John the Apostle had previously been a disciple of the Baptist, he would have been affected by that teaching.

The resulting revolution in Johannine scholarship was termed the new look by John A. T. Robinson, who coined the phrase in 1957 at Oxford. According to Robinson, this new information rendered the question of authorship a relative one. He considered a group of disciples around the aging John the Apostle who wrote down his memories, mixing them with theological speculation, a model that had been proposed as far back as Renan's Vie de Jésus ("Life of Jesus," 1863). The work of such scholars brought the consensus back to a Palestinian origin for the text, rather than the Hellenistic origin favored by the critics of the previous decades.

Gnosticism scholar Elaine Pagels claimed in 2003 that the author of the Fourth Gospel was a Gnostic, citing similarities with the Gospel of Thomas and the Gospel of Philip. According to Gnosticism scholar Pagels, "Qumran fever" that was raised by the discovery of the Scrolls was gradually dying down, with theories of Gnostic influences in the Johannine works beginning to be proposed again, especially in Germany. Some recent views have seen the theology of Johannine works as directly opposing "Thomas Christians".Riley, Gregory J., 1995. Resurrection Reconsidered: Thomas and John in Controversy. Minneapolis. Most scholars, however, consider the Gnosticism question closed.Dr. Craig Blomberg, cited in Lee Strobel The Case for Christ, 1998, Chapter 2.

Epistles of John

Most scholars agree that all three letters are written by the same author, although there is debate on who that author is. These three epistles are similar in terminology, style, and general situation. They are loosely associated with the Gospel of John and may result from that gospel's theology. Internal evidence as well as commentary by Papias and Polycarp suggest that the Johannine epistles originated in Asia Minor. Early references to the epistles, the organization of the church apparent in the text, and the lack of reference to persecution suggests that they were written early in the 2nd century.

First epistle
The phraseology of the first letter of John is very similar to that of the fourth gospel, so the question of its authorship is often connected to the question of authorship of the gospel. The two works use many of the same characteristic words and phrases, such as light, darkness, life, truth, a new commandment, to be of the truth, to do the truth and only begotten son. In both works, the same basic concepts are explored: the Word, the incarnation, the passing from death to life, the truth and lies, etc. The two works also bear many stylistic affinities to one another. In the words of Amos Wilder, the works share "a combination of simplicity and elevation which differs from the flexible discourse of Paul and from the more concrete vocabulary and formal features of the Synoptic Gospels."

Given the similarity with the Gospel, the "great majority" (as of 1957) of critical scholars assign the same authorship to the epistle that they assign to the Gospel. At the end of the 19th century, scholar Ernest DeWitt Burton was able to write that, "the similarity in style, vocabulary and doctrine to the fourth gospel is, however, so clearly marked that there can be no reasonable doubt that the letter and the gospel are from the same pen." Starting with Heinrich Julius Holtzmann, however, and continuing with C. H. Dodd, some scholars have maintained that the epistle and the gospel were written by different authors. There are at least two principal arguments for this view. The first is that the epistle often uses a demonstrative pronoun at the beginning of a sentence, then a particle or conjunction, followed by an explanation or definition of the demonstrative at the end of the sentence, a stylistic technique which is not used in the gospel. The second is that the author of the epistle, "uses the conditional sentence in a variety of rhetorical figures which are unknown to the gospel."

The book was not among those whose canonicity was in doubt, according to Eusebius; however, it is not included in an ancient Syrian canon. Theodore of Mopsuestia also presented a negative opinion toward its canonicity. Outside of the Syrian world, however, the book has many early witnesses, and appears to have been widely accepted.

The First Epistle of John assumes knowledge of the Gospel of John, and some scholars think that the epistle's author might have been the one who redacted the gospel.

Second and third epistles
Irenaeus, in the late second-century, quotes from 1st and 2nd John, and states that he is quoting the Apostle John. Eusebius claimed that the author of 2nd and 3rd John was not John the Apostle but actually John the Elder, due to the introductions of the epistles. However, modern scholars have argued that Eusebius made this conclusion based on a misinterpretation of a statement from Papias and a desire to invent a second John to be the author of Revelation. Carson suggests that the vocabulary, structure, and grammar of the Gospel of John is remarkably similar to 1st John, 2nd John and 3rd John.

Book of Revelation

The author of the Book of Revelation identifies himself as "John".  The book has been traditionally credited to John the Apostle. Reference to the apostle's authorship is found as early as Justin Martyr, in his Dialogue with Trypho''. Other early witnesses to this tradition are Papias, Irenaeus, Clement of Alexandria, Tertullian, Cyprian, and Hippolytus. This identification, however, was denied by other Fathers, including Dionysius of Alexandria, Eusebius of Caesarea, Cyril of Jerusalem, Gregory Nazianzen, and John Chrysostom. The Apocryphon of John, a Gnostic work, claims John as both the author of itself and Revelation. 

According to Epiphanius, one Caius of Rome believed that Cerinthus, a Gnostic, was the author of the Book of Revelation.

In the 3rd century, Bishop Dionysius of Alexandria rejected apostolic authorship but accepted the book's canonicity. Dionysius believed that the author was another man also named John, John the Presbyter, teacher of Papias, bishop of Hieropolis. Eusebius of Caesarea later agreed with this. Because authorship was one of several considerations for canonization, several Church Fathers and the Council of Laodicea rejected Revelation.

Mainstream scholars conclude that the author did not also write the Gospel of John because of wide differences in eschatology, language, and tone. The Book of Revelation contains grammatical errors and stylistic abnormalities whereas the Gospel and Epistles are all stylistically consistent which indicate its author may not have been as familiar with the Greek language as the Gospel/Epistles's author. Contemporary scholars note that when Revelation and the Gospel refer to Jesus as "lamb" they use different Greek words, and they spell "Jerusalem" differently. There are differing motifs between the book and the Gospel: use of allegory, symbolism, and similar metaphors, such as "living water", "shepherd", "lamb", and "manna". The Book of Revelation does not go into several typically Johannine themes, such as light, darkness, truth, love, and "the world" in a negative sense. The eschatology of the two works are also very different. Still, the author uses the terms "Word of God" and "Lamb of God" for Jesus Christ, possibly indicating that the author had a common theological background with the author of John.

Another issue arguing against authorship by John the Apostle is that "the apostles" are occasionally mentioned within the work, yet the author never indicates that he is one.  Revelation 4 describes a vision of twenty-four elders seated on twenty-four thrones, which is generally assumed to be a reference to Jesus's promise that the twelve disciples would be seated on thrones and judge the Twelve Tribes of Israel.  Yet, if the identification of the twenty-four elders as the disciples and the Patriarchs of the twelve tribes is accurate, the author does not mention seeing himself among the elders.

According to the testimony of Irenaeus, Eusebius and Jerome, the writing of this book took place near the very end of Domitian's reign, around 95 or 96.

See also
 Authorship of the Pauline epistles
 John 21
 John the Evangelist
 Textual criticism

Notes

References

Sources

Bibliography 

Bellinzoni, Arthur J. (25 February 2000). The Early Christian Community: From Diversity to Unity to Orthodoxy. Lecture delivered to the Wells College Faculty Club.

External links
 John 21:20-24 at Bible Gateway, or the same passage in English (NIV). (Other texts, the other passages mentioned, and other translations are also available at the same site.)
 Discussion of the view that John the Apostle did not write the book (and links to related material) at Early Christian Writings.
 New Catholic Encyclopedia article
 Orthodox Church of America's take

1st-century Christianity
2nd-century Christianity
Johannine works
Ephesus